The Juno Award for "Producer of the Year" has been awarded since 1975, as recognition each year for the best record producer in Canada.  It was renamed the "Jack Richardson Producer of the Year" award in 2003, after Jack Richardson who was a noted Canadian record producer.

Winners

Producer of the Year (1970–1977)
1970 - The Poppy Family, "Which Way You Goin' Billy?" by The Poppy Family 
1971 - Brian Ahern, "Snowbird" by Anne Murray 
1972 - Mel Shaw, "Sweet City Woman" by The Stampeders
1973 - Gene Martynec, "Last Song" by Edward Bear
1974 - No Award was Presented
1975 - Randy Bachman
1976 - Peter Anastasoff, "The Homecoming" by Hagood Hardy
1977 - Mike Flicker, Dreamboat Annie by Heart

Producer of the Year - Single (1978)
1978 - Matthew McCauley & Fred Mollin, "Sometimes When We Touch" by Dan Hill

Producer of the Year - Album (1978)
1978 - Matthew McCauley & Fred Mollin, Longer Fuse by Dan Hill

Producer of the Year (1979–1998)
1979 - Gino Vannelli, Joe Vannelli & Ross Vannelli, Brother to Brother by Gino Vannelli
1980 - Bruce Fairbairn, Armageddon by Prism
1981 - Gene Martynec, "Tokyo" by Bruce Cockburn and "High School Confidential" by Rough Trade
1982 - Paul Dean & Bruce Fairbairn, "Working for the Weekend" and "When It's Over" by Loverboy
1983 - Bill Henderson & Brian MacLeod, "Whatcha Gonna Do" and "Secret Information" from Opus X by Chilliwack
1984 - Bryan Adams, Cuts Like a Knife by Bryan Adams
1985 - David Foster, Chicago 17 by Chicago
1986 - David Foster, St. Elmo's Fire Soundtrack by various artists
1987 - Daniel Lanois, So by Peter Gabriel
1989 - Daniel Lanois & Robbie Robertson, "Showdown at Big Sky" and "Somewhere Down the Crazy River" from Robbie Robertson by Robbie Robertson
1990 - Bruce Fairbairn, Pump by Aerosmith
1991 - David Tyson, "Baby, It's Tonight" from A View from 3rd Street by Jude Cole and "Don't Hold Back Your Love" from Change of Season by Hall & Oates
1992 - Bryan Adams (Co-producer Robert John "Mutt" Lange), "(Everything I Do) I Do It for You" and "Can't Stop This Thing We Started" from Waking Up the Neighbours by Bryan Adams
1993 - k.d. lang & Ben Mink (Co-producer Greg Penny), "Constant Craving" and "The Mind of Love" from Ingénue by k.d. lang
1994 - Steven MacKinnon & Marc Jordan, "Waiting for a Miracle" from Reckless Valentine by Marc Jordan
1995 - Robbie Robertson, "Skin Walker" and "It Is a Good Day to Die" from Music for The Native Americans by Robbie Robertson
1996 - Michael Phillip Wojewoda, "End of the World" from Cock's Crow by The Waltons and "Beaton's Delight" from Hi™ How Are You Today? by Ashley MacIsaac
1997 - Garth Richardson, "Bar-X-the Rocking M" from Stag by Melvins and "Mailman" from Shot by The Jesus Lizard
1998 - Pierre Marchand, "Building a Mystery" from Surfacing by Sarah McLachlan

Best Producer (1999–2001)
1999 - Colin James (co-producer Joe Hardy), "Let's Shout" and "C'mon with the C'mon" from Colin James and the Little Big Band II by Colin James
2000 - Tal Bachman & Bob Rock, "She's So High" and "If You Sleep" from Tal Bachman by Tal Bachman
2001 - Gerald Eaton, Brian West & Nelly Furtado, "I'm like a Bird" and "Turn Off the Light" from Whoa, Nelly! by Nelly Furtado

Jack Richardson Best Producer (2002)
2002 - Daniel Lanois (co-producer Brian Eno), "Beautiful Day" and "Elevation" from All That You Can't Leave Behind by U2

Jack Richardson Producer of the Year (2003–present)
2003 - Alanis Morissette, "Hands Clean"; "So Unsexy"
2004 - Gavin Brown, "Try Honesty"; "I Hate Everything About You"
2005 - Bob Rock, "Welcome to My Life"; "Some Kind of Monster"
2006 - Neil Young, "The Painter"
2007 - Brian Howes, "Trip" and "Lips of an Angel" (Hedley)
2008 - Joni Mitchell, "Hana" and "Bad Dreams"
2009 - Daniel Lanois, "Here Is What Is" and "Not Fighting Anymore" (Daniel Lanois)
2010 - Bob Rock, "Haven't Met You Yet" and "Baby (You've Got What It Takes)" from Crazy Love by Michael Bublé
2011 - Daniel Lanois, "Hitchhiker" from Le Noise by Neil Young and "I Believe in You" from Black Dub by Black Dub
2012 - Brian Howes, "Heaven's Gonna Wait" from Storms by Hedley and "Trying Not to Love You" from Here and Now by Nickelback
2013 - James Shaw, "Youth Without Youth" and "Breathing Underwater" from Synthetica by Metric
2014 - Cirkut (co-producer Luke Gottwald), "Wrecking Ball" from Bangerz by Miley Cyrus and "Give It 2 U" from Blurred Lines by Robin Thicke
2015 - Adam Messinger, "Change Your Life" (co-producer Nasri Atweh) from The New Classic by Iggy Azalea; "Rude" from Don't Kill the Magic by Magic!
2016 - Bob Ezrin, "Honey Honey", "What Love Is All About" from What Love Is All About by Johnny Reid
2017 - A Tribe Called Red, "R.E.D." feat. Yasiin Bey, Narcy & Black Bear, "Sila" feat. Tanya Tagaq from We Are the Halluci Nation by A Tribe Called Red
2018 - Diana Krall, "L-O-V-E", "Night and Day"
2019 - Eric Ratz, "People's Champ", "Relentless" (Arkells, Rally Cry)
2020 - Ben Kaplan - "Brittle Bones Nicky" (Rare Americans), "It's Alright" (Mother Mother)
2021 - WondaGurl: "Aim for the Moon" (Pop Smoke feat. Quavo); "Gang Gang" (JackBoys and Sheck Wes)
2022 - WondaGurl — "Fair Trade" (Drake feat. Travis Scott), "Made a Way" (FaZe Kaysan feat. Lil Durk and Future)
2023 - Akeel Henry — "For Tonight" (Giveon), "Splash" (John Legend)

References

Producer